Here and Now is a 1970 French-Canadian film directed by Denis Héroux. The film is seen as a sequel to Valérie also directed by Héroux. The film has been called maple syrup porn. L’Initiation grossed more money than its predecessor, making it the one of the highest-grossing Canadian films at the domestic box office.

Plot
Victoire (Renaud), A University of Montreal student, has an affair with a famous French author and professor Gervais Messiandre (Riberolles) after being disappointed with her first sexual experience with her boyfriend, Pierre (Chartrand). While Victoire is having the affair with Gervais, Pierre is seeing Victoire's friend and roommate Nadine (Ouimet). Victorie and Gervais spend a couple of nights together in a hotel in Montreal but return to their lives shortly after.

Production
Here and Now started filming in September 1969, and ended on October 18, with a budget of $200,000.

Release
The film was released in Montreal on 29 January 1970, and grossed $2.5 million. The film grossed $1,883,000 in Canada making it the second-highest-grossing film of all time in Canada, behind Claude Fournier's Deux femmes en or, also released in 1970, which grossed $2.5 million.

The film was entered in competition at the 22nd Canadian Film Awards in 1970, although Cinepix Film Properties, the film's studio, subsequently withdrew it and Love in a Four Letter World from the competition after an article in Time implied that the Canadian Film Award jury was unsympathetic to the films' sexual content.

References

Works cited

External links

L'Initiation at AllCine

1970 films
Films set in Montreal
Films directed by Denis Héroux
Films shot in Montreal
Films produced by John Dunning
1970s French-language films
French-language Canadian films
Canadian sexploitation films
1970s Canadian films
Canadian pornographic films